Siege of Callao may refer to:
 First siege of Callao, 1821, during the Peruvian War of Independence
 Second siege of Callao, 1824–1826, during the Peruvian War of Independence
 Third siege of Callao, 1838, during the War of the Confederation

See also
Blockades of Callao